William Alphonse Maloney (June 5, 1878 – September 2, 1960) was an American professional baseball outfielder. He played in Major League Baseball (MLB) for the Milwaukee Brewers / Browns, Cincinnati Reds, Chicago Cubs, and Brooklyn Superbas between 1901 and 1908.

Maloney led the National League in stolen bases (59) in 1905. In six seasons, he played in 696 games and had 2,476 at-bats, 585 hits, 294 runs, 177 runs batted in, 155 stolen bases, and a .236 batting average.

An alumnus of Georgetown University, he died in Breckenridge, Texas at the age of 82.

See also
 List of Major League Baseball annual stolen base leaders

References

External links

1878 births
1960 deaths
National League stolen base champions
Major League Baseball outfielders
Baseball players from Maine
Milwaukee Brewers (1901) players
St. Louis Browns players
Cincinnati Reds players
Chicago Cubs players
Brooklyn Superbas players
Georgetown University alumni
Anderson Orphans players
Grand Rapids Orphans players
Kansas City Cowboys (minor league) players
Minneapolis Millers (baseball) players
Rochester Bronchos players
Mobile Sea Gulls players
Fort Worth Panthers players
Beaumont Oilers players
San Antonio Bronchos players
Sportspeople from Lewiston, Maine